Nagawado Dam is a dam in Nagano Prefecture, Japan, on the Azusa River completed in 1969. The dam is located in Azumi, Matsumoto City.

Construction began in 1961. The construction of the dam created Lake Azusa.

The Azumi Power Station is operated by Tokyo Electric Power Company (TEPCO). The dam is part of the Azusa 3 Dams, along with Midono Dam; and the Inekoki Dam. The dams use pumped-storage hydroelectricity.

See also

List of dams and reservoirs in Japan

References

Dams in Nagano Prefecture
Dams completed in 1969